is a Japanese former Nippon Professional Baseball pitcher.

References 

1971 births
Living people
Baseball people from Ibaraki Prefecture 
Kanagawa University alumni
Japanese baseball players
Nippon Professional Baseball pitchers
Fukuoka Daiei Hawks players
Nippon Professional Baseball Rookie of the Year Award winners